Room and Board is a 1921 American silent drama film directed by Alan Crosland and written by Donnah Darrell and Charles E. Whittaker. The film stars Constance Binney, Thomas Carrigan, Malcolm Bradley, Arthur Housman, Jed Prouty, and Blanche Craig. The film was released on August 17, 1921, by Paramount Pictures. It is not known whether the film currently survives, and it may be a lost film.

Cast 
Constance Binney as Lady Noreen
Thomas Carrigan as Terrence O'Brienn 
Malcolm Bradley as Ephraim Roach
Arthur Housman as Desmond Roach
Jed Prouty as Robert Osborne
Blanche Craig as Mary
Ben Hendricks Jr. as Ryan
Ellen Cassidy as Leila
Arthur Barry as The Earl of Kildoran

References

External links 

1921 films
1920s English-language films
Silent American drama films
1921 drama films
Paramount Pictures films
Films directed by Alan Crosland
American black-and-white films
American silent feature films
1920s American films